Cầu River is a river of northern Vietnam. It flows through the provinces/cities of Bắc Kạn, Thái Nguyên, Bắc Giang, Hanoi, Bắc Ninh. It begins at the Phia Bioóc Peak in Chợ Đồn District, west of mountainous province of Bắc Kạn.

The river has a length of 288 km and basin area of 6,030 km².

Rivers of Bắc Giang province
Rivers of Bắc Kạn province
Rivers of Bắc Ninh province
Rivers of Thái Nguyên province
Rivers of Hanoi
Rivers of Vietnam